Tyson United Methodist Church, also known as Versailles United Methodist Church, is a historic Methodist church located at Versailles, Ripley County, Indiana.  It was built in 1937, and is a two-story, Art Deco style church building sheathed in white glazed brick and terra cotta.  It features a stylized Corinthian order front portico, round arched entry with bronze doors, and curved bays and ribbon windows.  The church is topped by a tall, open lattice work spire of cast aluminum.

It was added to the National Register of Historic Places in 1994.

References

Methodist churches in Indiana
Churches on the National Register of Historic Places in Indiana
Art Deco architecture in Indiana
Churches completed in 1937
Buildings and structures in Ripley County, Indiana
National Register of Historic Places in Ripley County, Indiana
1937 establishments in Indiana